Mikhail Evdokimovich Tkachev (November 10, 1912, Kalach, Voronezh Province, Russian Empire - December 10, 2008, Saint Petersburg, Russia) was a Soviet, Russian painter, Honored Artist of Russian Federation, lived and worked in Saint Petersburg, regarded as one of the representatives of the Leningrad school of painting, most famous for his landscape paintings.

Biography 
Mikhail Evdokimovich Tkachev was born November 10, 1912, in the large cossack stanitsa of Kalach, Voronezh Province, Russian Empire, located at the confluence of the Tolucheyevka River  and Podgornaya River, 294 kilometers (183 mi) from Voronezh. The Kalach was established in 1716 and was granted town status in 1945.

In 1929 the family moved to the city of Armavir, where Michael Tkachev goes to the Artistic and Technical School, which graduated in 1932.

Since 1932 Michael Tkachev in Leningrad. In 1932-1937 he attend an evening class of Tavricheskaya Art School, then the Art Studio of the Leningrad House of Officers of Red Army, studied of Mikhail Avilov, Sergei Prisyolkov, Pavel Naumov, Yefim Cheptsov.

In 1939-1945 Mikhail Tkachev took part in the Red Army in the Winter War (1939–1940) and in the Second World War. He was wounded and received military awards.

Since 1951 Mikhail Tkachev has participated in Art Exhibitions. Painted portraits, landscapes, genre and battle compositions. Solo Exhibitions by Mikhail Tkachev were in Leningrad (1986) and Saint Petersburg(1992).

Leading themes of Mikhail Tkachev paintings were images of native land and a memory of wartime. The most picturesque his studies from the life with the parental home and the surrounding Kalach. The colors restrained, with a predominance of green and ocher tones. Painting based on the transfer of light and shadow effects, tonal relations and the constructive role of drawing.

Mikhail Tkachev is a member of the Saint Petersburg Union of Artists (before 1992 - Leningrad branch of Union of Artists of Russian Federation) since 1952, a Member of Peter's Academy of Sciences and Arts (1995).

In 1996, Mikhail Tkachev was awarded the honorary title of Honored Artist of Russian Federation.

Mikhail Evdokimovich Tkachev died on December 10, 2008 in Saint Petersburg. His paintings reside in Art museums and private collections in Russia, France, in the U.S., Finland, Germany, England, Japan, and other countries.

Honours and awards
Order of the Red Star
Order of the Patriotic War 1st class
Medal "For the Defence of Leningrad"
Medal "For the Defence of the Caucasus"
Medal "For the Capture of Königsberg"
Medal "For the Victory over Germany in the Great Patriotic War 1941–1945"

See also
 Leningrad School of Painting
 List of Russian artists
 List of 20th-century Russian painters
 List of painters of Saint Petersburg Union of Artists
 List of the Russian Landscape painters
 Saint Petersburg Union of Artists

References

Sources 
 Matthew C. Bown. Dictionary of 20th Century Russian and Soviet Painters 1900-1980s. - London: Izomar, 1998. , .
 Vern G. Swanson. Soviet Impressionism. - Woodbridge, England: Antique Collectors' Club, 2001. - , .
 Tkachev Mikhail. Painting. Drawing. - Saint Petersburg: 2002.
 Artists of Peter's Academy of Arts and Sciences. - Saint Petersburg: Ladoga Edition, 2008. - pp. 178–179.
 Sergei V. Ivanov. Unknown Socialist Realism. The Leningrad School. - Saint Petersburg: NP-Print Edition, 2007. – pp. 18, 371, 389-393, 396, 397, 402-406, 439, 445. , .

1912 births
2008 deaths
Soviet military personnel of World War II
20th-century Russian painters
Russian male painters
21st-century Russian painters
Soviet painters
Socialist realist artists
Members of the Leningrad Union of Artists
Russian landscape painters
Honored Artists of the Russian Federation
20th-century Russian male artists
21st-century Russian male artists